This was the first edition of the tournament.

Sander Gillé and Joran Vliegen won the title after defeating Lukáš Klein and Alex Molčan 6–2, 7–5 in the final.

Seeds

Draw

References

External links
 Main draw

Bratislava Open - Doubles
Bratislava Open